
Year 619 (DCXIX) was a common year starting on Monday (link will display the full calendar) of the Julian calendar. The denomination 619 for this year has been used since the early medieval period, when the Anno Domini calendar era became the prevalent method in Europe for naming years.

Events 
 By place 
 Byzantine Empire 
 Byzantine–Sasanian War: The besieged city of Alexandria is captured by the Persians. Nicetas, cousin of Emperor Heraclius, and Chalcedonian patriarch, John V, flee to Cyprus. King Khosrow II extends his rule southwards along the Nile.
 Heraclius prepares to leave Constantinople and moves the Byzantine capital to Carthage, but is convinced to stay by Sergius I, patriarch of Constantinople. He begins to rebuild the Byzantine army with the aid of funds from church treasures.
 The Avars attack the outskirts of Constantinople. Numerous Slavic tribes rebel against Avar overlordship; they carve out their own sovereign territory in Moravia and Lower Austria (approximate date).

 Asia 
 The Meccan boycott of the Hashemites and Muhammad ends.
 November 2 – Tang campaigns against the Western Turks: A khagan of the Western Turkic Khaganate is assassinated in a Chinese palace by Eastern Turkic rivals, with the approval of Emperor Gaozu of Tang.

 By topic 
 Arts and sciences 
 The calculation of the Chinese calendar begins to use true motions of the sun and moon, modeled using two offset opposing parabolas.
 The Chinese begin using large orchestras.

 Religion 
 December 23 – Pope Boniface V succeeds Adeodatus I as the 69th pope of Rome.
 Muhammad's wife, Khadija, dies after 24 years of marriage in the Year of Sorrow. 
 Kubrat, ruler of the Bulgars, is baptised in Constantinople.
 Mellitus becomes Archbishop of Canterbury.

Births 
 Abd Allah ibn Abbas, cousin of Muhammad (d. 687)
 Disibod, Irish monk and hermit (d. 700)
 Li Chengqian, prince of the Tang dynasty (d. 645)
 Li Ke, prince of the Tang dynasty (approximate date)

Deaths 
 February 2 – Lawrence, Archbishop of Canterbury
 September 14 – Yang You, emperor of the Sui dynasty (b. 605)
 Abu Talib ibn Abd al-Muttalib, uncle of Muhammad (b. 549)
 Eulji Mundeok, military leader of Goguryeo (Korea)
 Heshana Khan, ruler of the Western Turkic Khaganate
 John Moschus, Byzantine monk and ascetical writer
 John the Merciful, Patriarch of Alexandria (approximate date)
 Khadija bint Khuwaylid, wife of Muhammad 
 Li Gui, emperor of the short-lived state Liang
 Li Mi, rebel leader during the Sui dynasty (b. 582)
 Liu Wenjing, chancellor of the Tang dynasty (b. 568)
 Yang Tong, emperor of the Sui dynasty (b. 605)
 Yuwen Huaji, general of the Sui dynasty

References

Sources 

 
  Date range in the title as printed, also appears in searches as 363–628.